William Nelson Hood (6 January 1848 — 25 October 1921) was an English first-class cricketer and Royal Navy officer.

The son of Alexander Hood, 1st Viscount Bridport and Lady Penelope Hill, he was born at Westminster in January 1848. He served in the Royal Navy as a lieutenant, prior to being placed on the retired list in October 1873. Hood made two appearances in first-class cricket for the Marylebone Cricket Club, playing against Oxford University at Oxford in 1875 and Kent at Lord's in 1880. Hood died at Fulham in October 1921.

References

External links

1848 births
1921 deaths
Younger sons of viscounts
People from Westminster
Royal Navy officers
English cricketers
Marylebone Cricket Club cricketers